Great Munden is a village and civil parish in Hertfordshire, England. The village includes the church of St Nicholas, Munden Bury, and a rectory that includes the remains of a moat. Other settlements in the parish include Nasty and Levens Green. A detached portion of Little Munden was added to the parish in 1888.

See also
List of civil parishes in Hertfordshire
List of lost settlements in Hertfordshire
List of lost settlements in the United Kingdom
List of places in Hertfordshire

References

External links

mundens.net

Villages in Hertfordshire
Civil parishes in Hertfordshire
East Hertfordshire District